Gerhard Breitenberger (born 7 February 1979) is an Austrian footballer who currently plays for the SV Friedburg.

External links
 

1979 births
Living people
Austrian footballers
Austrian Football Bundesliga players
FC Braunau players
BSV Bad Bleiberg players
SK Bischofshofen players
FC Red Bull Salzburg players
SC Austria Lustenau players
1. FC Vöcklabruck players
SK Austria Kärnten players
SV Grödig players
USK Anif players
Association football midfielders
People from St. Johann im Pongau District
Footballers from Salzburg (state)